Paxton James Lynch (born February 12, 1994) is an American football quarterback for the Orlando Guardians of the XFL. He played college football at Memphis, and was drafted in the first round of the 2016 NFL Draft by the Denver Broncos. Lynch played just two seasons in Denver and made four starts before being released prior to the 2018 season. Lynch has also been a member of the Seattle Seahawks, Pittsburgh Steelers, Saskatchewan Roughriders, and Michigan Panthers.

Early years
Lynch attended Trinity Christian Academy in Deltona, Florida, where he played football and basketball. During his high school career, he passed for 2,099 yards. Lynch was rated by Rivals.com as a three-star recruit. He committed to the University of Memphis to play college football.

College career
After redshirting for his freshman year at Memphis in 2012, Lynch was named the Tigers' starting quarterback prior to the 2013 season. He started all 12 games, completing 203 of 349 passes for 2,056 yards, nine touchdowns and 10 interceptions. As a sophomore in 2014, Lynch started all 13 games. He completed 259 of 413 attempts for 3,031 yards, 22 touchdowns, and nine interceptions. He also rushed for 321 yards and 13 touchdowns. Lynch was named the MVP of the 2014 Miami Beach Bowl after passing for 306 yards with four passing touchdowns and three rushing touchdowns. As a junior in 2015, Lynch again started all 13 games. He completed 296 of 443 passes (66.8%) for 3,778 yards, 28 touchdowns (all five school records) and four interceptions. In Memphis' 63–0 victory over SMU, Lynch tied an FBS record with seven passing touchdowns in a half. He finished 9 of 14 for 222 yards, and completed his touchdown throws to seven different receivers. After the season, he decided to forgo his senior year and enter the 2016 NFL Draft. Lynch graduated from Memphis in May 2016 with a B.S.E. in sport and leisure management.

Lynch's 35 touchdowns responsible for in 2014 and 30 in 2015 are first and second in Memphis history, and his 76 for his career is second all-time. He also ranks first and second for most total offense in a season (4,015 yards in 2015; 3,352 in 2014). He has four of the seven most passing yards in a game, including the school record 447 on October 23, 2015, at Tulsa. He ranks second all-time in career attempts, completions, completion percentage, passing yards, and passing touchdowns.

College statistics

Professional career
Lynch was predicted to be selected in the first round of the 2016 NFL Draft by draft analysts and in mock drafts prior to the draft. He was rated the third best quarterback in the 2016 draft by NFLDraftScout.com.

Denver Broncos

2016

The Denver Broncos selected Lynch in the first round (26th overall) of the 2016 NFL Draft in a pick acquired from the Seattle Seahawks for their first and third round pick.  He was the third of 15 quarterbacks taken, behind Jared Goff and Carson Wentz, the #1 and #2 overall picks. On June 9, 2016, the Broncos signed Lynch to a four-year, $9,476,296 contract with a $5,091,852 signing bonus.

On October 2, 2016, Lynch played in his first NFL regular-season game against the Tampa Bay Buccaneers, replacing the injured Trevor Siemian. He finished with 170 passing yards on 14 of 24 attempts and threw his first career touchdown pass to wide receiver Emmanuel Sanders in a 27–7 road win at Raymond James Stadium. In Week 5, Lynch started his first NFL game, completing 23 of 35 passes for 223 yards, one touchdown, and one interception in the 23–16 loss to the Atlanta Falcons. He was sacked six times, a record for a Broncos rookie. In Week 13, Lynch again replaced the injured Siemian against the Jacksonville Jaguars, posting 12 completions on 24 passing attempts for 104 yards in a 20–10 win. Overall, he finished his rookie season with 497 passing yards, two passing touchdowns, and one interception.

2017
Lynch suffered a shoulder injury against the Green Bay Packers in the team's third preseason game of the 2017 season. In Week 11 against the Cincinnati Bengals, Lynch was active for the first time that season and was the backup to Brock Osweiler. On November 21, Lynch was named the team's starter for the Week 12 game against the Oakland Raiders. Lynch completed 9 of 14 passes for 41 yards and an interception that occurred in the endzone, the Raiders' first interception of the season. Lynch left the game with an ankle injury in the third quarter and was relieved by Siemian for the remainder of the game as the Broncos lost 21–14. A day after the game, it was announced that Lynch would miss two to four weeks due to his injury. On December 31, Lynch started the regular season finale against the Kansas City Chiefs. In the 27–24 loss, he finished 21 of 31 for 254 passing yards, two touchdowns, and two interceptions.

2018
Going into mini-camps for the 2018 season, it was announced that Lynch would serve as backup quarterback, behind the newly acquired Case Keenum. Two days after the Broncos preseason opener against the Minnesota Vikings, the team announced that Lynch had been demoted to third-string quarterback as Chad Kelly was promoted to backup. He was released by the Broncos on September 2, 2018, after the team acquired Kevin Hogan. In two seasons with the team, Lynch made just four starts and threw four touchdowns and four interceptions.

Seattle Seahawks
On January 17, 2019, Lynch signed with the Seattle Seahawks after spending the 2018 season as a free agent. He was waived on August 30, 2019, during final roster cuts.

Pittsburgh Steelers
On September 17, 2019, Lynch was signed to the Pittsburgh Steelers practice squad. He was promoted to the active roster on October 11, 2019, following an injury to Mason Rudolph.

On September 5, 2020, Lynch was waived by the Steelers during final roster cuts.

Saskatchewan Roughriders
On June 28, 2021, it was announced that Lynch had signed with the Saskatchewan Roughriders of the Canadian Football League (CFL). He did not dress for games during the season as he was the fourth string quarterback and spent most of the time on the one-game injured list. He was released on February 22, 2022.

Michigan Panthers
On February 22, 2022, Lynch signed with the United States Football League and was selected with the eighth pick of the 12th round of the 2022 USFL Draft by the Michigan Panthers. Lynch was the last of 16 quarterbacks taken in the draft and the only one to have started an NFL regular season game before being drafted. He was transferred to the inactive roster on May 5, 2022, with a leg injury.

Orlando Guardians
Lynch signed with the Orlando Guardians of the XFL on January 30, 2023. In his Week 1 start against the Houston Roughnecks, Lynch completed 14-20 passes for 125 yards with 1 passing touchdown as well as 1 interception before being benched for backup QB Quinten Dormady in the 33–12 loss. His benching led him to be the first quarterback to ever be benched in the NFL, CFL, USFL, and XFL.

Career statistics

References

External links

Denver Broncos bio
Memphis Tigers bio

1994 births
Living people
American football quarterbacks
Denver Broncos players
Memphis Tigers football players
People from Deltona, Florida
Pittsburgh Steelers players
Players of American football from Florida
Players of Canadian football from Florida
Players of American football from San Antonio
Players of Canadian football from San Antonio
Saskatchewan Roughriders players
Seattle Seahawks players
Michigan Panthers (2022) players
Orlando Guardians players